Live at Newport '77 was the second live recording of the Toshiko Akiyoshi – Lew Tabackin Big Band and was followed by another release, Live at Newport II recorded on the same day.  Both albums were recorded at the 1977 Newport Jazz Festival.

Track listing
All arrangements by Toshiko Akiyoshi.  All songs composed by Akiyoshi except "Yet Another Tear" (Tabackin).
LP side A
"Strive for Jive" – 8:22
"A-10-205932" – 14:32
LP side B
"Hangin' Loose" – 10:05
"Since Perry" / "Yet Another Tear" – 16:01

Personnel
Toshiko Akiyoshi – piano
Lew Tabackin – tenor saxophone and flute
Gary Herbig – tenor saxophone
Gary Foster – alto saxophone
Dick Spencer – alto saxophone
Beverly Darke – baritone saxophone
Steven Huffsteter – trumpet
Bobby Shew – trumpet
Mike Price – trumpet
Richard Cooper – trumpet
Bill Reichenbach Jr. – trombone
Charlie Loper – trombone
Rick Culver – trombone
Phil Teele – bass trombone
Don Baldwin – bass
Peter Donald – drums

References / External Links
RCA Victor (Japan) Records RVC RVJ-6005 
[ Allmusic] 

Toshiko Akiyoshi – Lew Tabackin Big Band albums
Albums recorded at the Newport Jazz Festival
1977 live albums
Baystate Records albums